Vijnaneshwara was a prominent jurist of twelfth century India. His treatise, the Mitakshara, dealt with inheritance, and is one of the most influential legal treatises in Hindu law. Mitakshara is the treatise on Yājñavalkya Smṛti, named after a sage of the same name.

Vijnaneshwara was born in the village of Masimadu, near Basavakalyan in Karnataka.

He lived in the court of king Vikramaditya VI (1076-1126), the Western Chalukya Empire monarch.

References

Vijnaneshwara

Ancient Indian law
12th-century Indian writers
Hindu law
People from Kalaburagi
Writers from Karnataka
Indian male writers